The Sri Lanka cricket team and Pakistani cricket team toured UAE from 18 October to 25 November 2011. The tour included three Tests, five One Day Internationals (ODIs) and one T20I between Sri Lanka and Pakistan.

Squads

Test series

1st Test

2nd Test

3rd Test

ODI series

1st ODI

2nd ODI

3rd ODI

4th ODI

5th ODI

T20I Series

Only T20I

References

External links 
 livecricketcentral.com
 google
 Pakistan vs Sri Lanka 2011 Photos

2011 in Pakistani cricket
2011 in Sri Lankan cricket
2011 in Emirati cricket
Cricket in the United Arab Emirates
International cricket competitions in 2011–12
Pakistani cricket seasons from 2000–01
2011-12